Events in the year 1932 in the British Mandate of Palestine.

Incumbents
 High Commissioner – Sir Arthur Grenfell Wauchope
 Emir of Transjordan – Abdullah I bin al-Hussein
 Prime Minister of Transjordan – Abdallah Sarraj

Events

 According to official statistics there were 9,555 Jewish immigrants during 1932.
 23 January – The founding of Kfar Yona. 
 28 March – The 1932 Maccabiah Games, the first Maccabiah Games ever held, are opened in Tel Aviv.
 19 July – The founding of the moshav Avihayil on a waste stretch of sand dunes, land owned by the Jewish National Fund.
 13 August – Independence Party (Palestine) established.
 1 December – The Palestine Post  (now The Jerusalem Post) is published for the first time.

Unknown dates
 The founding of kibbutz Ma'abarot by Romanian Jews affiliated with the Hashomer Hatzair movement.
 The founding of kibbutz Afikim by Russian Jews affiliated with the Hashomer Hatzair movement.
 The founding of the moshav Tel-Tzur by The Herzliya Hebrew Gymnasium teachers led by Haim Boger. The moshav was later on merged with Even Yehuda.
 The founding of the moshav Beer Ganim by former employees of the Dead Sea Works company. The moshav was later on merged with Even Yehuda.
 The founding of the moshav Ramat Tyomkin. The moshav merged with Netanya in 1948.
 The founding of the moshav Neta'im by residents of other moshavim as part of the Settlement of the Thousand plan.
 The founding of the moshav Ganei Am by immigrants from Germany who were members of the HaOved HaTzioni group.
 The founding of the moshava Even Yehuda by the "Bne Binyamin" association on the lands acquired by the philanthropist Samuel S. Bloom.
 The founding of the kibbutz Givat Haim by Jewish European immigrants .

Notable births
 12 January – Itzik Kol, Israeli film producer (died 2007).
 13 January – Shafiq al-Hout, Palestinian Arab politician and writer, co-founder of the PLO (died 2009).
1 February – Batsheva Kanievsky, Israeli rebbetzin (died 2011). 
 10 February – Yosef Ba-Gad, Israeli politician and Rosh Yeshiva.
 22 February – Zvi Ofer, Israeli soldier, former military governor of Nablus (died 1968).
 22 March – Nehemia Sirkis, Israeli sports shooter and firearms designer.
 2 May – Ariel Weinstein, Israeli politician and journalist (died 1996).
 9 July – Amitzur Shapira, Israeli athletics coach, murdered at the Munich Olympics (died 1972).
 25 July – Esther Streit-Wurzel, Israeli children's author and educator (died 2013).
 21 August – Menashe Kadishman, Israeli painter and sculptor (died 2015).
 28 August – Yakir Aharonov, Israeli physicist.
 9 October – Dvora Omer, Israeli author (died 2013).
 31 October – Ruth Rasnic, Israeli social and political activist.
 5 November – Yossi Banai, Israeli performer, singer, actor, and dramatist (died 2006).
 13 November - Nahum Rakover, Israeli jurist.
 19 November – Abdel Rahman Zuabi, Israeli-Arab judge, first Arab to serve as a judge on the Supreme Court of Israel (died 2014).
 20 November - Yona Fischer, Israeli art curator (died 2022).
 23 December – Avraham Sharir, Israeli politician (died 2017).
 Full date unknown
 Eli Hurvitz, Israeli industrialist, former Chairman and CEO of Teva Pharmaceutical Industries (died 2011).

References 

 
Palestine
Years in Mandatory Palestine